Teagues may refer to:

 Vince Teagues, fictional character
 Dave Teagues, fictional character

See also
Teague (disambiguation)